Adam Mayfield (born August 2, 1976) is an American actor. He is best known for portraying Scott Chandler on the ABC soap opera All My Children. He has joined the cast of NBC soap opera drama series Days of Our Lives, and debuted in 2015.

Biography
Mayfield was born August 2, 1976, and grew up in Houston. He has one brother, two half-brothers, and two half-sisters. He appeared in various other TV shows and movies guest-starring in minor roles. He attended the High School for the Performing and Visual Arts and earned a BFA in acting from the DePaul Theatre School.

Filmography

Film

Television

References

External links 
 

American male soap opera actors
American male television actors
American male film actors
People from Texarkana, Texas
DePaul University alumni
Male actors from Houston
Living people
1976 births
High School for the Performing and Visual Arts alumni